USS PC-472 was a  built for the United States Navy during World War II. She was transferred to the French Navy in June 1944 and renamed Le Ruse. She remained in French service until 1959.

Career
PC-472 was laid down at Defoe Shipbuilding Company in Bay City, Michigan, on 1 July 1941; launched on 14 November; and was commissioned on 9 December 1941.

The ship was loaned to the French under Lend-Lease on 30 June 1944 and was sold to them in March 1949.  She remained in their service as Le Ruse until 1959.

See also

List of Escorteurs of the French Navy

References

External links
 Photo gallery at Naval Historical Center

 

PC-461-class submarine chasers
Ships built in Bay City, Michigan
1941 ships
World War II patrol vessels of the United States
PC-461-class submarine chasers of the French Navy
World War II patrol vessels of France
Cold War patrol vessels of France